Cuidaré de Ti (English: I'll Take Care of You) is the fifth studio album of the Colombian Christian singer, Álex Campos, released on July 29, 2008 by CanZion. This album is based mostly on God talking to you through songs and God giving you hope. It is a rock type of album, different from his previous albums. This album was nominated for a Latin Grammy Award for Best Christian Album (Spanish Language) and the songs "As the Color of Blood"(Cómo El Color De La Sangre) and "Tell me" (Dímelo), were nominated for Best Music Video and Best Collaboration, respectively in Premios ARPA.

Track listing

Charts

References

Alex Campos albums
2008 albums
Spanish-language albums